Teofik Bekteshi was an Albanian politician and mayor of Elbasan from 1942 through 1943.

References

Year of birth missing
Year of death missing
Mayors of Elbasan